Mesto Alexandrovo is a rural locality (a selo) in Vysokovskoye Rural Settlement, Ust-Kubinsky District, Vologda Oblast, Russia. The population was 29 as of 2002. There are 2 streets.

Geography 
Mesto Alexandrovo is located 18 km southwest of Ustye (the district's administrative centre) by road. Makaryino is the nearest rural locality.

References 

Rural localities in Tarnogsky District